Sinzheim is a municipality in the district of Rastatt, in Baden-Württemberg, Germany. It is located 6 km west of Baden-Baden, and 11 km south of Rastatt.

Mayors

Franz Zoller: (1912–2002) 1957–1977
Hans Metzner: (born 1951) 1977–2009
In May 2009 Erik Ernst was elected mayor with nearly 64 % of the votes.

Sons and daughters of the community 

 Anton Baumstark (1800–1876), philologist
 Lothar von Kübel (1823–1881), bishop, diocesan rector in Freiburg im Breisgau

References

External links

Historic Jewish communities
Rastatt (district)